Kanyenye is an administrative ward in Tabora Urban District of Tabora Region in Tanzania. According to the 2012 census, the ward has a total population of 10,063.

References

Wards of Tabora Urban District
Wards of Tabora Region